Zerah or Zérach ( /  "sunrise" Standard Hebrew Zéraḥ / Záraḥ, Tiberian Hebrew Zéraḥ / Zāraḥ) refers to several different people in the Hebrew Bible.

An Edomite
Zerah was the name of an Edomite chief. He was listed as the second son of Reuel, son of Basemath, who was Ishmael's daughter and one of the wives of Esau the brother of Jacob (Israel).

Son of Tamar and Judah
According to the Book of Genesis, Zerah was the son of Tamar and Judah, and was the twin of Perez. This same Zerah is mentioned in the genealogy of Jesus in Matthew 1:3.

Zerah is also listed as the ancestor of Achan, who was stoned to death as recounted in the Book of Joshua. Achan is the son of Carmi, a descendant of Zimri, the son of Zerah.

Simeonite clan
The Bible also identifies Zerah as the name of the founder of one of the Simeonite clans.

The Cushite
Zerah the Cushite is mentioned by the Book of Chronicles. There he is said to have invaded the Kingdom of Judah with an enormous army, in the days of Asa). According to the text, when Zerah's army reached that of Asa at the valley of Zephathah near Mareshah, Zerah's army was utterly defeated, by divine intervention, and Asa's forces collected a large volume of spoils of war.

The invasion, and its implied time-frame, means that the traditional view was to consider this Zerah to have actually been Usarkon II or Usarkon I, both being rulers of Egypt. Usarkon II is known to have entered the Kingdom of Judah with a huge army in 853 BCE; however, rather than attacking Judah, the army was just passing through, on its way to attack the Assyrian forces. In addition, Asa's reign is traditionally dated to have ended in 873 BCE. In the Book of Kings, which doesn't mention Asa's defeat of Zerah, Asa is described as being extremely weak from a defensive point of view and Biblical scholars regard the idea that Asa could defeat an enormous Egyptian army to be untenable. More recent scholars consider that Zerah the Cushite may have been a military commander under Osorkon I, rather than a Pharaoh.

Furthermore, Cushite refers to Kush. The publication by Naville (1891) of an inscription in which Usarkon II would claim to have invaded Lower and Upper Palestine suggests this Pharaoh as the victor over Asa. However, the Bible contends that Asa won the battle.

It is a possibility that Cushites  gained dominance in Upper and Lower Egypt during the 9th and 8th century. Zerah was most likely a Cushite of Nubia located in Southern Egypt and Northern Sudan who came to power as ruler of Egypt or at the very least a Nubian commander of The Egyptian/Nubian armies. William F. Albright suggested that Zerah was the governor of a Cushite colony, which was established by Shishak after his campaign in Israel.  tell us that the Cushitic (Ethiopians) were feared far and wide for conquests and destruction (being a powerful nation who dominated ancient kingdoms. Cushites were a very formidable people who were expert archers famous in ancient world for surprise attacks with the bow and arrow.

In the genealogies of the Book of Chronicles
The Book of Chronicles mentions a Zerah who was a Gershonite Levite.

References

Further reading
 Zerah the Kushite: A New Proposal Regarding His Identity (with Peter James), in: P. James and P. van der Veen (eds.), Solomon and Shishak, BAR International Series 2732, Archaeopress, Oxford, 2015 

Book of Genesis people
Biblical twins
Tribe of Judah
Set index articles on Hebrew Bible people

sv:Sera